Néapolis is the eleventh studio album (of original material) by Scottish rock band Simple Minds, released in March 1998 by record label Chrysalis.

Background and content

After being released from their contract with Virgin Records, Simple Minds decided to musically reinvent themselves yet again. Having worked since 1991 as a duo with session musicians, Jim Kerr and Charlie Burchill reunited on a rehearsals-only basis with the band's original rhythm section, Derek Forbes and Brian McGee (returning after eleven & fourteen year absences respectively). McGee was not involved in the project beyond the rehearsal stage, but Forbes formally rejoined Simple Minds as bass guitar player in July 1996. To record the album, Simple Minds also reunited with producer Peter Walsh, who'd been responsible for their acclaimed 1982 New Gold Dream (81-82-83-84) album.

The resulting set of songs (written entirely by Kerr and Burchill) was a move away from the band's more recent stadium rock and funk approaches and a return to their early-'80s electronic pop days (inspired by European experimental pop such as Kraftwerk and Hansa-period David Bowie) as well as incorporating contemporary dance music influences. While the reinstated Forbes played all of the bass tracks, drums were handled either by session players Michael Niggs and Jim McDermott or replaced by programmed loops provided by Hamilton Lee of Transglobal Underground. In early 1997, the band brought in their former drummer Mel Gaynor for a studio session, resulting in him playing the drums on one track  "War Babies". In a March 1998 interview with Q, Kerr would comment that «Néapolis wasn't created as some kind of spiritual successor [to New Gold Dream], but I suppose that in getting back together with the people we work best with, some kind of thematic similarity was inevitable.»

Release 

Néapolis was released by Chrysalis Records in the UK, but charted poorly and received mixed reviews. Chrysalis refused to release the album in the U.S. (citing lack of interest). The album produced two singles "Glitterball" and "War Babies,", the former featuring a video which was the first production of any kind to film at the Guggenheim Museum in Bilbao, Spain. Videos for both singles were included on enhanced CD singles released for both tracks.

In early 1998, Gaynor was reinstated as a full-time member in time for live dates. With Mark Taylor as live keyboard player, the band toured Europe between March and July 1998 to support the new album, but the tour was dogged by band members' health problems and contractual fiascos (including a pull-out from the Fleadh Festival). The band parted company with Chrysalis Records after the tour. In 1999, recording sessions for a new Simple Minds album saw Gaynor and Forbes dropped from the band once again in favour of Mark Kerr and Eddie Duffy (although Gaynor would return to the band later).

Reception 
The album received mixed reviews.
The NMEs Jim Alexander lamented the effort, describing it as, "still the same windswept rock posturing wrapped up in slightly glitzier clothes.". In a more positive review for Allmusic, Paul Fucito wrote, "It's nice to know that in the 1990s, one classic new wave band hasn't forgotten what it is all about."

Track listing

Personnel
Adapted from the album's liner notes.Simple Minds Jim Kerr –  vocals
 Charlie Burchill –  guitars, keyboards, programming
 Derek Forbes –  bass guitar
 Mel Gaynor –  drums on "War Babies"Additional musicians Jim McDermott –  additional drums  
 Michael Niggs –  additional drums 
 Hamilton Lee –  additional programming
 The Dukes –  stringsTechnical'
 Charlie Burchill – producer
 Peter Walsh – producer, engineer, mixing
 Simple Minds – mixing
 Alessandro R.A. Benedetti – assistant engineer (Capri)
 Marco Della Monica – assistant engineer (Capri)
 Dougie Cowan – technical assistance
 Sandra Dods – coordination
 Toorkwaz – art direction, design
 Andy Earl – photography

References

External links

1998 albums
Simple Minds albums
Albums produced by Peter Walsh
Chrysalis Records albums